Udupi railway station is a railway station in Udupi district, Karnataka. Its code is UD. The station consists of two platforms. Most of the platform is not sheltered from the heavy rains that Udupi receives. The Konkan railway route in which trains are pulled by Diesel locomotives (Diesel engines) will now be powered by Electric locomotives after electrification of this route. Konkan railway conducted a trial run of Electric locomotives on 13 January 2020, Monday from Thokur railway station to Udupi railway station. The electric locomotive started from Thokur at 4p.m. and reached Udupi at 6p.m. On return journey the electric locomotive reached Thokur at 8p.m.

Facilities at Udupi railway station  
Udupi railway station has a multipurpose stall and refreshment stall on platform 1. It has a restaurant at basement near parking area. Udupi railway station has fresh up facility where passengers can use this facility to take rest on hourly basis.  The Udupi railway station has cashless facilities to help passengers not carrying cash (currency notes). As a part of initiative to become green, Udupi railway station has installed solar power generation of 7 kW out of station's requirement of 48 kW on 5 June 2016.

Trains 

 Matsyagandha Express (Mangaluru Central to Mumbai Lokmanya Tilak Terminus)
 Hisar–Coimbatore AC Superfast Express, via Jodhpur, Vadodara, Panvel, Madgao, Mangaluru
 Kerala Sampark Kranti Express (Chandigarh to Kochuveli)
 Kochuveli–Lokmanya Tilak Terminus Garib Rath Express
 Netravati Express
 Thiruvananthapuram Rajdhani Express
 Marusagar Express (Ajmer to Ernakulam)
 Poorna Express (via Belagavi)
 Pune–Ernakulam Express
 Mangaluru–Madgaon Passenger
 Madgaon–Mangaluru Intercity Express

References

Railway stations in Udupi district
Karwar railway division
Railway stations along Konkan Railway line